Thomas Edward Rall (December 27, 1929 – October 6, 2020) was an American actor, ballet dancer, tap dancer, and acrobatic dancer who was a prominent featured player in 1950s musical comedies. He later became a successful operatic tenor in the 1960s, making appearances with the Opera Company of Boston, the New York City Opera, and the American National Opera Company.

Life and career
Rall was born in Kansas City, Missouri to Edward and Margaret Rall, but raised in Seattle, Washington. An only child, he had a crossed eye which made it hard for him to read books, so his mother enrolled him in dancing classes. In his early years he performed a dance and acrobatic vaudeville act in Seattle theaters and attempted small acting roles.

His family moved to Los Angeles in the 1940s, and Rall began to appear in small movie roles. His first film appearance was a short MGM film called Vendetta. He began taking tap dancing lessons and became a member of the jitterbugging Jivin' Jacks and Jills at Universal Studios.

Rall joined Donald O'Connor, Peggy Ryan, and Shirley Mills in several light wartime Andrews Sisters vehicles including Give Out, Sisters (1942), Get Hep to Love (1942), and Mister Big (1943), among others. He appeared in the films The North Star and Song of Russia (1944).

Rall took ballet lessons and danced in classical and Broadway shows, including Milk and Honey, Call Me Madam, and Cry for Us All. Jerry Herman said of Rall in Milk and Honey: "[Donald] [Saddler] did extraordinary choreography for Tommy Rall, who was suddenly so admired by the audience that [the producer] put his name on the marquee under the three stars. It was very, very earned by him. He was a terrific singer and dancer."

He is best known for his acrobatic dancing in several classic musical films of the 1950s, including Kiss Me, Kate as "Bill" (1953), Seven Brides for Seven Brothers as "Frank" (1954), Invitation to the Dance (1956), Merry Andrew as "Giacomo Gallini" (1958), and My Sister Eileen as "Chick" (1955).

Rall's film career waned as movie musicals went into decline. He had a role in the movie Funny Girl, as "The Prince" in a parody of the ballet Swan Lake. On Broadway he danced to acclaim as "Johnny" in Marc Blitzstein and Joseph Stein's 1959 musical Juno (based on Seán O'Casey's play Juno and the Paycock). Ken Mandelbaum wrote: "DeMille provided two fine ballets: her second act 'Johnny' in which Tommy Rall danced out Johnny's emotions...was the evening's highlight."

He took the title role in a production of Massenet's Le jongleur de Notre-Dame by the New England Opera Theatre in Boston in 1961 in a role which required both singing and juggling and dancing.

Rall was highly respected by his contemporaries—including dance greats Gene Kelly and Donald O'Connor—with the latter describing Rall as one of the “greatest dancers living...above Astaire and Kelly.”

Personal life
Rall was briefly married to his Juno co-star Monte Amundsen. He later married former ballerina Karel Shimoff.

In 2007, a Texas dance instructor by the name of Fredric Brame was found to have been posing as Tommy Rall since the late 1960s. When Rall found out about the masquerade decades later, through a friend of the family, Rall contacted the Montgomery County, Texas Sheriff's office. No legal action was taken against Brame. Rall wanted Brame to stop taking credit for his work and warned that if he continued or did it again a lawsuit would be filed.

Death
In September 2020, Rall had heart surgery and recovered at the Fireside Health Center (Santa Monica, California). Subsequently, in October, he had additional heart surgery at Providence Saint John's Health Center (Santa Monica, California). He died around 5 P.M. on October 6 of congestive heart failure, aged 90. He was survived by his wife, Karel, and their son, Aaron, a Lieutenant-Colonel in the US Army. Another son, David, predeceased his parents.

Filmography
Sources: TCM; MasterWorks Broadway

Features:
What's Cookin'? (1942) as Member, The Jivin' Jacks and Jills (uncredited)
Private Buckaroo (1942) as Member of the Jivin' Jacks and Jills (uncredited)
Give Out, Sisters (1942) as Member of the Jivin' Jacks and Jills
Get Hep to Love (1942) as Member - Jivin' Jacks (uncredited)
It Comes Up Love (1943) as Stag (uncredited)
Mister Big (1943) as 'Jivin' Jacks and Jills' Member (uncredited)
Always a Bridesmaid (1943) as Member of The Jivin' Jacks and Jills (uncredited)
The North Star (1943) as Dancing Peasant (uncredited)
Song of Russia (1944) as Dancing Peasant (uncredited)
Ziegfeld Follies (1945) as Chorus Boy (uncredited)
Kiss Me Kate (1953) as Bill Calhoun 'Lucentio'
Seven Brides for Seven Brothers (1954) as Frank (Frankincense) Pontipee
My Sister Eileen (1955) as Chick
The Second Greatest Sex (1955) as Alf Connors
World in My Corner (1956) as Ray Kacsmerek
Invitation to the Dance (1956) as The Sharpie in 'Ring Around the Rosy'
Walk the Proud Land (1956) as Taglito
Merry Andrew (1958) as Giacomo Gallini
Funny Girl (1968) as Prince in 'Swan Lake' Parody (uncredited)
Pennies from Heaven (1981) as Ed
Dancers (1987) as Patrick
Saturday the 14th Strikes Back (1988) as The Werewolf (final film role)
Broadway: Beyond the Golden Age (2018, Documentary) as Himself
Short Subjects:
Vendetta (1942) as Bit Part (uncredited)
Trumpet Serenade (1942) as Himself - Member, 'The Jivin' Jacks and Jills'

Stage work, Broadway
Source: MasterWorksBroadway; Internet Broadway Database

American Concertette (1945)
Ballet Theatre (1946) 
Look Ma, I'm Dancin'! (as Tommy) (1948) 
Small Wonder (1948) 
Miss Liberty (as The Boy, The Dandy, Another Lamplighter) (1949) 
Call Me Madam (Principal Dancer) (1950) (also understudy for Russell Nype)
Juno (as Johnny Boyle) (1959)
Milk and Honey (as David) (1961) 
Cafe Crown (as David Cole) (1964) 
Cry for Us All (as Petey Boyle) (1970)

References

Sources
Koegler, Horst (1998). "Rall, Tommy", Dizionario della danza e del balletto, p. 392. Gremese Editore. . 
Mordden, Ethan (2002). Open a new window: the Broadway musical in the 1960s. Palgrave Macmillan, p. 102.

External links
  
  
 
 (vidéo Danse Routine - Tommy Rall & Ann Miller -Kiss me Kate film  sur youtube.com: https://www.youtube.com/watch?v=-P84-_7kCiQ

1929 births
2020 deaths
20th-century American male actors
20th-century American singers
American male ballet dancers
American male dancers
American male film actors
American male musical theatre actors
American male singers
American tap dancers
American tenors
Deaths from congestive heart failure
Male actors from Kansas City, Missouri
Musicians from Kansas City, Missouri
Singers from Missouri